Tonga has competed in the IAAF World Athletics Championships six times with their first appearance being in 1983 at Helsinki, Finland with Georges Taniel competing in the men's 100m. As of 2019, the country has not recorded any medals. Tonga best performance was in 1983 when Niulolo Pelesikoti placed eighteenth in the Men's decathlon.

Entrants

References 

 
Tonga
World Athletics Championship